The Galveston Railroad Museum is a railroad museum housed in the former Santa Fe Railroad station, at 25th and Strand in Galveston, Texas. The Museum is owned and operated by the Center for Transportation and Commerce, a non-profit organization.

The museum was established with funds from Galveston businesswoman and philanthropist Mary Moody Northen and the Moody Foundation.

See also

List of National Historic Landmarks in Texas
National Register of Historic Places listings in Galveston County, Texas
Recorded Texas Historic Landmarks in Galveston County
Galveston Island Trolley

References

External links

HawkinsRails' Galveston Railroad Museum page
Galveston Railroad Museum homepage

Railroad museums in Texas
Museums in Galveston, Texas
Atchison, Topeka and Santa Fe Railway stations
National Register of Historic Places in Galveston County, Texas
Recorded Texas Historic Landmarks
Model railroads
Galveston, Texas